5F-NNE1 (also known as 5F-NNEI and 5F-MN-24) is an indole-based synthetic cannabinoid that is presumed to be a potent agonist of the CB1 receptor and has been sold online as a designer drug. Given the known metabolic liberation (and presence as an impurity) of amantadine in the related compound APINACA, it is suspected that metabolic hydrolysis of the amide group of 5F-NNE1 may release 1-naphthylamine, a known carcinogen.

Legality
Sweden's public health agency suggested classifying 5F-NNE1 as hazardous substance on November 10, 2014.

See also 

 5F-ADBICA
 5F-SDB-006
 AM-2201
 FDU-NNE1
 FUB-144
 MMB-2201
 NNE1
 PX-1

References 

Designer drugs
Organofluorides
Indolecarboxamides
Naphthoylindoles